Polar Similar is the seventh studio album by American metalcore band Norma Jean. The album was released on September 9, 2016 through Solid State Records, the band's first release on the label since 2008's The Anti Mother. This is Norma Jean's only release with guitarist Phillip Farris and the last with bassist John Finnegan and drummer Clayton Holyoak.

With the departure of guitarist Chris Day in 2015, Polar Similar is the first Norma Jean album to not feature any original members.

Recording and production
The album was recorded in January 2016 at Pachyderm Studios in Cannon Falls, Minnesota, where artists such as Nirvana, Failure, P.J. Harvey, and Explosions in the Sky have recorded albums. The album was produced by Josh Barber and the band. The title of the song "Everyone Talking Over Everyone Else" is a tribute to Lemmy of Motörhead, while the song itself is about an abusive relationship that vocalist Cory Brandan Putman was in.

Release
"1,000,000 Watts" was the first song to be released from the album, premiering on June 14, 2016. The song caused some minor controversy in the Christian music scene upon its release as the song contains the line "I'm not fucking around." The album was released on September 9 through Solid State Records, the band's first release on the label since 2008's The Anti Mother. Four days later, on September 13, a music video was released for the song "Everyone Talking Over Everyone Else." The video, directed by Anthony Altamura, shows the band performing the song in a dimly lit room along with footage of people in abusive relationships.

Track listing

Personnel
Norma Jean
 Cory Brandan – vocals, guitar
 Jeff Hickey – guitar
 Phillip Farris – guitar
 John Finnegan – bass
 Clayton Holyoak – drums, auxiliary percussion

Additional personnel
 Josh Holyoak – Sound design, keyboards, ambient sounds, and additional percussion throughout the album.  Production at the end of track 13
 Adam Putman – additional percussion, piano and organ on tracks 4 and 13, background vocals on track 8
 Ben "Bob" Turkovic – additional percussion, engineering
 Sean Ingram – additional vocals on track 3
 Josh Barber – production, additional guitars on tracks 1 and 2
 Norma Jean – production
 Josh Barber – engineering
 Jeremy S.H. Griffith – mixing
 Drew Lavyne – mastering

References

2016 albums
Norma Jean (band) albums
Solid State Records albums